Glen Rose is a community in northeastern Hot Spring County, Arkansas.

The community is located seven miles northeast of Malvern and ten miles southwest of Benton on U.S. Route 67. Interstate 30 passes one mile northwest of the community. Ninemile Creek and Tenmile Creek pass to the west and east sides of the community.

The community acquired its name from a school in the area. The name was given either as Glen for the location in a valley and Rose for the roses found on the school grounds or it was named for University of Arkansas coach Glen Rose.

See also
 Glen Rose School District

References

Unincorporated communities in Hot Spring County, Arkansas
Unincorporated communities in Arkansas